Jamie McIntosh is both the founder and the executive director of International Justice Mission (IJM) Canada, an organization dedicated to rescuing children from being exploited overseas. He has a master's degree in international human rights law from the University of Oxford.

Organization
McIntosh founded the Canadian branch of IJM in 2002, after having spent a year and a half in prayer about how to alleviate oppression in other countries. Jacob Moon performed a benefit concert in Hamilton, Ontario for IJM Canada in 2006 after McIntosh recommended a book to him that made Moon aware of the organization. Also in 2006, McIntosh appeared before the Canadian House of Commons Standing Committee on Status of Women, calling the House of Commons to rescue female slaves in South Asia from their bondage.

Human trafficking
At the 2008 Slavery in the 21st Century conference at Temple Emanu-El-Beth Sholom, McIntosh delivered a presentation entitled "When the Good Do Something: Countering Human Trafficking". At a 2011 contemporary-slavery-themed gathering at Douglas Park in Langley, British Columbia, McIntosh spoke about slavery on a global scale, while Mark Warawa and Peter Fassbender spoke to the issue on the provincial and local levels respectively. In 2012, McIntosh spoke about slavery and IJM at the Justice Summit at the Metropolitan Bible Church in Ontario. McIntosh is one of several Canadian abolitionists who have strongly endorsed Andrew Kooman's She Has a Name, a play toured across Canada in 2012 educating Canadians about human trafficking.

References

21st-century Christians
Alumni of New College, Oxford
Canadian Christians
Canadian human rights activists
Canadian lawyers
Canadian women's rights activists
Children's rights activists
Living people
Male feminists
Proponents of Christian feminism
Year of birth missing (living people)